Lee Buck Trevino (born December 1, 1939) is an American retired professional golfer who is regarded as one of the greatest players in golf history. He was inducted to the World Golf Hall of Fame in 1981. Trevino won six major championships and 29 PGA Tour events over the course of his career. He is one of only four players to twice win the U.S. Open, The Open Championship and the PGA Championship. The Masters Tournament was the only major that eluded him. He is an icon for Mexican Americans, and is often referred to as "The Merry Mex" and "Supermex," both affectionate nicknames given to him by other golfers.

Early life
Trevino was born in Garland, Texas, into a family of Mexican ancestry. He was raised by his mother, Juanita Trevino, and his grandfather, Joe Trevino, a gravedigger. Trevino never knew his father, Joseph Trevino, who left when his son was small. During his childhood, Trevino occasionally attended school and worked to earn money for the family. At age 5, he started working in the cotton fields.

Trevino was introduced to golf when his uncle gave him a few golf balls and an old golf club. He then spent his free time sneaking into nearby country clubs to practice and began as a caddie at the Dallas Athletic Club, near his home. He soon began caddying full-time. Trevino left school at age 14 to go to work. He earned $30 a week as a caddie and shoe shiner. He was also able to practice golf since the caddies had three short holes behind their shack. After work, he would hit at least 300 balls. Many of these practice shots were struck from the bare ground with very little grass (known locally as 'Texas hardpan') and often in very windy conditions. It is this that is widely believed to be the reason Trevino developed his extremely distinct, unique (many would say unorthodox), and compact swing method which he went on to develop with tremendous effect. A very pronounced controlled 'fade' was his signature shot, although he had many other shot-types in his repertoire and he is, still to this day, remembered as one of the very finest shot-makers of all time.

When Trevino turned 17 in December 1956, he enlisted in the United States Marine Corps, and served four years as a machine gunner and was discharged in December 1960 as a corporal with the 3rd Marine Division. He spent part of his time playing golf with Marine Corps officers. He played successfully in Armed Forces golf events in Asia, where one rival was Orville Moody, who would follow Trevino to the PGA Tour in the late 1960s.

Professional career
After Trevino was discharged from the Marines, he went to work as a club professional in El Paso, Texas. He made extra money by gambling for stakes in head-to-head matches. He qualified for the U.S. Open in 1966, made the cut, and tied for 54th, earning $600. He qualified again in 1967 and shot 283 (+3), eight shots behind champion Jack Nicklaus, and only four behind runner-up Arnold Palmer. Trevino earned $6,000 for finishing fifth, which earned him Tour privileges for the rest of the 1967 season. He won $26,472 as a rookie, 45th on the PGA Tour money list, and was named Rookie of the Year by Golf Digest. The fifth-place finish at the U.S. Open also earned him an exemption into the following year's event.

In 1968, his second year on the circuit, Trevino won the U.S. Open at Oak Hill Country Club, in Rochester, New York, four strokes ahead of runner-up Nicklaus, the defending champion. During his career, Trevino won 29 times on the PGA Tour, including six majors. He was at his best in the early 1970s, when he was Jack Nicklaus's chief rival. He won the money list title in 1970, and had six wins in 1971 and four wins in 1972.

Trevino had a remarkable string of victories during a 20-day span in the summer of 1971. He defeated Nicklaus in an 18-hole playoff to win the 1971 U.S. Open. Two weeks later, he won the Canadian Open (the first of three), and the following week won The Open Championship (British Open), becoming the first player to win those three titles in the same year. Trevino was awarded the Hickok Belt as the top professional athlete of 1971. He also won Sports Illustrated magazine's "Sportsman of the Year" and was named ABC's Wide World of Sports Athlete of the Year.

In 1972 at Muirfield in Scotland, Trevino became the first player to successfully defend The Open Championship since Arnold Palmer in 1962. In a remarkable third round at Muirfield, Trevino had five consecutive birdies from the 14th through the 18th, holing a bunker shot on the 16th and sinking a 30–foot chip on the 18th for a round of 66. In the final round, Trevino was tied for the lead on the 17th tee with Tony Jacklin. Trevino chipped in from rough on the back of the green for a par on the 17th. A shaken Jacklin three-putted the same hole from 15 feet for a bogey. Trevino parred the 18th hole for a final round of 71, winning him the Open by a stroke over Nicklaus, with Jacklin finishing third. Trevino holed out four times from off the greens during the tournament. Nicklaus had won the first two majors of the year (Masters, U.S. Open) and fell just short in the third leg of the grand slam. After holing his chip shot on the 17th in the final round, Trevino said: "I'm the greatest chipper in the world."

In 1974, Trevino won the Greater New Orleans Open without scoring any bogeys, the only time it had happened in a PGA Tour individual event until J. T. Poston accomplished the feat at the 2019 Wyndham Championship. At the PGA Championship he won the fifth of his six major championships. He won the title by a stroke, again over Nicklaus, the fourth and final time Nicklaus was a runner-up in a major to Trevino. At the Western Open near Chicago in 1975, Trevino was struck by lightning, and suffered injuries to his spine. He underwent surgery to remove a damaged spinal disk, but back problems continued to hamper his play. Nevertheless, he was ranked second in McCormack's World Golf Rankings in 1980 behind Tom Watson. Trevino had 3 PGA Tour wins in 1980 and finished runner-up to Tom Watson in the 1980 Open Championship. At the age of 44, Trevino won his sixth and final major at the PGA Championship in 1984, with a 15-under-par score of 273, becoming the first player to shoot all four rounds under 70 in the PGA Championship. He was the runner-up the following year in 1985, attempting to become the first repeat champion since Denny Shute in 1937.

In the early 1980s, Trevino was second on the PGA Tour's career money list, behind only Nicklaus. From 1968 to 1981 inclusive, Trevino won at least one PGA Tour event a year, a streak of 14 seasons. He also won more than 20 international and unofficial professional tournaments. He was one of the charismatic stars who was instrumental in making the Senior PGA Tour (now the PGA Tour Champions) an early success. He claimed 29 senior wins, including four senior majors. He topped the seniors' money list in 1990 and 1992.

Like many American stars of the era, Trevino played a considerable amount overseas. Early in his career he played sporadically on the Australasian Tour. He finished runner-up in the 1969 and 1970 Dunlop International and ultimately won down under at the 1973 Chrysler Classic. He also won an event on the Japan Golf Tour, the Casio World Open in 1981. Trevino also had a great deal of success in Europe. Among his greatest triumphs were at the 1971 Open Championship and 1972 Open Championship. Trevino was also invited to play at the very prestigious (though unofficial) Piccadilly World Match Play Championship three times (1968, 1970, 1972). He reached the finals twice. His most notable performance probably came in 1970 when he defeated defending Masters champion Billy Casper in the quarterfinals and defending PGA champion Dave Stockton in the semifinals. He also won two regular European Tour events late in his career at 1978 Benson & Hedges International Open and 1985 Dunhill British Masters. In fact, his last regular tour win was at the British Masters. Additionally, he finished runner-up at three European Tour events: the 1980 Bob Hope British Classic, 1980 Open Championship, and the 1986 Benson & Hedges International Open.

From 1983 to 1989, he worked as a color analyst for PGA Tour coverage on NBC television. In 2014 Trevino was named "Golf Professional Emeritus" at The Greenbrier resort in White Sulphur Springs, West Virginia, a position previously held by Sam Snead and Tom Watson.

Masters Tournament
At the Masters Tournament in 1989, 49-year-old Trevino opened with a bogey-free five-under-par 67 to become the oldest to lead the field after a round in the tournament. It came despite Trevino's words twenty years earlier, when he said after the 1969 edition: "Don't talk to me about the Masters. I'm never going to play there again. They can invite me all they want, but I'm not going back. It's just not my type of course." Trevino said that he felt uncomfortable with the atmosphere at Augusta National and that he disliked the course because his style of play, where he liked to fade low shots left to right, was not suited to the course.

Trevino did not accept invitations to the Masters in 1970, 1971, and 1974. In 1972, after forgoing the previous two Masters tournaments, he stored his shoes and other items in the trunk of his car, rather than use the locker room facilities in the clubhouse. Trevino complained that had he not qualified as a player, the club would not have let him onto the grounds except through the kitchen. But he later described his boycott of the Masters as "the greatest mistake I've made in my career" and called Augusta National "the eighth wonder of the world."

After his opening round 67 in 1989, Trevino tied for eighteenth; his best career result at the Masters was a tie for tenth (1975, 1985).

Distinctions and honors
 Trevino was the first player to shoot all four regulation rounds under par at the U.S. Open. At Oak Hill in 1968, Trevino played rounds of 69-68-69-69.
 A major street in El Paso, Texas was named Lee Trevino Drive in his honor, and streets in Rio Rancho and Belen, New Mexico were also named for him.
 One of two golfers to win the PGA Tour's three oldest events in the same year: The Open Championship (1860), the U.S. Open (1895), and the Canadian Open (1904).  Trevino won in 1971 and Tiger Woods won in 2000
 Trevino played for the United States in the Ryder Cup six times (1969, 1971, 1973, 1975, 1979, 1981), and had an impressive 17–7–6 record. He also served as team captain in 1985.
 Trevino won the Vardon Trophy for lowest scoring average five times: 1970, 1971, 1972, 1974 and 1980.
 Trevino has established numerous scholarships and other financial aid to Mexican-Americans.
 Trevino was inducted into the World Golf Hall of Fame in 1981.
 In 2000, Golf Digest magazine ranked Trevino as the 14th-greatest golfer of all time.

Humor
Throughout his career, Trevino was seen as approachable and humorous, and was frequently quoted by the press. Late in his career, he remarked, "I played the tour in 1967 and told jokes and nobody laughed. Then I won the Open the next year, told the same jokes, and everybody laughed like hell."

At the beginning of Trevino's 1971 U.S. Open playoff against Jack Nicklaus, he threw a rubber snake that his daughter had put in his bag as a joke at Nicklaus, who later admitted that he asked Trevino to throw it to him so he could see it. Trevino grabbed the rubbery object and playfully tossed it at Nicklaus, getting a scream from a nearby woman and a hearty laugh from Nicklaus. Trevino shot a 68 to defeat Nicklaus by three strokes.

During one tournament, Tony Jacklin, paired with Trevino, said: "Lee, I don't want to talk today." Trevino retorted: "I don't want you to talk. I just want you to listen."

Trevino made a notable cameo appearance in the comedy Happy Gilmore.

After he was struck by lightning at the 1975 Western Open, Trevino was asked by a reporter what he would do if he were out on the course and it began to storm again. Trevino answered he would take out his 1-iron and point it to the sky, "because not even God can hit a 1-iron." Trevino said later in an interview with David Feherty that he must have tempted God the week before by staying outside during a lightning delay to entertain the crowds, saying "I deserved to get hit...God can hit a 1-iron."

Trevino said: "I've been hit by lightning and been in the Marine Corps for four years. I've traveled the world and been about everywhere you can imagine. There's not anything I'm scared of except my wife."

Professional wins (92)

PGA Tour wins (29)

PGA Tour playoff record (5–5)

European Tour wins (5)

European Tour playoff record (1–1)

Japan Golf Tour wins (1)

Sunshine Tour wins (1)

PGA Tour of Australasia wins (1)

Canadian Tour wins (2)

Other wins (17)
1965 Texas State Open
1966 Texas State Open, New Mexico Open
1969 World Cup (team with Orville Moody), World Cup Individual Trophy
1971 World Cup (team with Jack Nicklaus)
1972 New Mexico Open
1973 Mexican Open
1974 World Series of Golf
1975 Mexican Open
1977 Morocco Grand Prix
1978 Lancome Trophy
1980 Lancome Trophy, Johnnie Walker Trophy
1981 PGA Grand Slam of Golf
1987 Skins Game
2001 Tylenol Par-3 Shootout

Senior PGA Tour wins (29)

*Note: The 1991 Vantage at The Dominion was shortened to 36 holes due to rain.

Senior PGA Tour playoff record (3–3)

Other senior wins (10)
 1991 Liberty Mutual Legends of Golf (with Mike Hill)
 1992 Mitsukoshi Classic, Liberty Mutual Legends of Golf (with Mike Hill)
 1993 American Express Grandslam
 1994 American Express Grandslam
 1995 Liberty Mutual Legends of Golf (with Mike Hill)
 1996 Liberty Mutual Legends of Golf (with Mike Hill), Australian PGA Seniors Championship
 2000 Liberty Mutual Legends of Golf – Legendary Division (with Mike Hill)
 2003 ConAgra Foods Champions Skins Game

Major championships

Wins (6)

1Defeated Jack Nicklaus in 18-hole playoff; Trevino 68 (−2), Nicklaus 71 (+1).

Results timeline

CUT = missed the halfway cut
"T" indicates a tie for a place.

Summary

 Most consecutive cuts made – 16 (1969 Open Championship – 1973 PGA)
 Longest streak of top-10s – 2 (seven times)

The Players Championship

Wins (1)

Results timeline

CUT = missed the halfway cut
WD = withdrew
DQ = disqualified
"T" indicates a tie for a place.

Champions Tour major championships

Wins (4)

U.S. national team appearances
Professional
 Ryder Cup: 1969 (tied), 1971 (winners), 1973 (winners), 1975 (winners), 1979 (winners), 1981 (winners), 1985 (non-playing captain)
 World Cup: 1968, 1969 (winners, individual winner), 1970, 1971 (winners), 1974

See also

 Hispanics in the United States Marine Corps
 List of golfers with most PGA Tour Champions wins
 List of golfers with most Champions Tour major championship wins
 List of golfers with most PGA Tour wins
 List of men's major championships winning golfers
 Monday Night Golf
 Lee Trevino's Fighting Golf

References

Further reading

External links
 
 
 
 
 Profile at answers.com

American male golfers
PGA Tour golfers
PGA Tour Champions golfers
Ryder Cup competitors for the United States
Winners of men's major golf championships
Winners of senior major golf championships
World Golf Hall of Fame inductees
Golf writers and broadcasters
Golfers from Dallas
United States Marine Corps non-commissioned officers
BBC Sports Personality World Sport Star of the Year winners
American sportspeople of Mexican descent
1939 births
Living people